Ismail Pasha may refer to:

 Ayaşlı İsmail Pasha (1620–1690), Ottoman grand vizier (1688)
 Çelebi Ismail Pasha (died 1702), Ottoman governor of Egypt, Rumelia, Sidon, Konya, Anatolia, Damascus, Crete, Baghdad, and Van
 Ismail Pasha al-Azm (r. 1721-1730), Ottoman governor of Damascus and Tripoli
 Ismail Pasha (Tripolitanian) (fl. 1780–1792), Ottoman governor of Egypt and Morea
 Ismail Selim Pasha (c. 1809–1867), Egyptian general of Greek and Turkish origin
 Isma'il Raghib Pasha (1819–1894), better known as Raghib Pasha, Ottoman politician and Prime Minister of Egypt
 Isma'il Pasha (1830–1895), Albanian Khedive (King and Governor) of Egypt and Sudan (1864–1879)
 Ismail Fazil Pasha (1856–1921), Albanian Ottoman general and politician
 Ismail Sedki Pasha (1875–1950), better known as Isma'il Sidqi, Egyptian politician and Prime Minister
 Ismail Enver Pasha (1881–1922), better known as Enver Pasha, Ottoman military officer of Albanian and Turkish heritage known as Minister of War of Ottoman  Empire during  WW1.

See also
 Ismail (name)
 Pasha (title)